Roland Milošević (born 26 January 1969) is a Venezuelan windsurfer. He competed at the 1988 Summer Olympics, representing Yugoslavia, and the 1996 Summer Olympics, representing Venezuela.

References

1969 births
Living people
Venezuelan male sailors (sport)
Venezuelan windsurfers
Olympic sailors of Yugoslavia
Olympic sailors of Venezuela
Sailors at the 1988 Summer Olympics – Division II
Sailors at the 1996 Summer Olympics – Mistral One Design
Place of birth missing (living people)